Malakichthys elegans, the splendid sea bass, is a species of marine ray-finned fish belonging to the family Acropomatidae. This fish is found in the Indo-Pacific region.

References

Fish described in 1943
Acropomatidae